Recce  may refer to:

 Reconnaissance, military scouting
 SEAL Recon Rifle, a rifle used by US Navy SEALs also called the Recce Rifle
 Recce (filmmaking), a pre-shoot reconnaissance of a film location
 South African Special Forces Brigade, nicknamed the Recces
 Reconnaissance (rallying), observation of racetrack prior to rally motorsport races

See also

Reconnaissance (disambiguation)

Reece (disambiguation)